The Journal of the Indian Society of Remote Sensing is an academic journal about remote sensing published by Springer on behalf of the Indian Society of Remote Sensing.
Its editor-in-chief is Dr. Shailesh Nayak; Editor is Dr. V.K. Dadhwal; and Executive editor is Dr. S.P. Aggarwal;
its 2021 impact factor is 1.894.

References

Remote sensing journals
Springer Science+Business Media academic journals
Academic journals associated with learned and professional societies of India